Alessandro Manzo (24 October 1913 – 29 July 1994) was an Italian sculptor. His work was part of the sculpture event in the art competition at the 1948 Summer Olympics.

References

1913 births
1994 deaths
20th-century Italian sculptors
20th-century Italian male artists
Italian male sculptors
Olympic competitors in art competitions
People from Termini Imerese
Artists from the Province of Palermo